Harpalus colchicus is a species of ground beetle in the subfamily Harpalinae. It was described by Victor Motschulsky in 1850.

References

colchicus
Beetles described in 1850